In Abrahamic religions, the Sabbath or Shabbat (from Hebrew  ) is a day set aside for rest and worship. According to the Book of Exodus, the Sabbath is a day of rest on the seventh day, commanded by God to be kept as a holy day of rest, as God rested from creation. The practice of observing the Sabbath (Shabbat) originates in the biblical commandment "Remember the sabbath day, to keep it holy".

The Sabbath is observed in Judaism, Sabbatarian forms of Christianity (such as many Protestant and Eastern denominations), and Islam. Observances similar to, or descended from, the Sabbath also exist in other religions. The term may be generally used to describe similar weekly observances in other religions.

Biblical Sabbath

Sabbath (as the verb שָׁבַת֙ shabbat) is first mentioned in the Genesis creation narrative, where the seventh day is set aside as a day of rest (in Hebrew, shabbat) and made holy by God. Observation and remembrance of Sabbath ( shabbat) is one of the Ten Commandments (the fourth in the original Jewish, the Eastern Orthodox, and most Protestant traditions, the third in Roman Catholic and Lutheran traditions).

Most Jews who observe the Sabbath regard it as having been instituted as a perpetual covenant for the Israelites, as a sign respecting two events: the day during which God rested after having completed Creation in six days and the Israelites' deliverance from Egypt. However, most Sabbath-keeping Christians regard the Sabbath as having been instituted by God at the end of Creation week and that the entire world was then, and continues to be, obliged to observe the seventh day as Sabbath.

Originally, Sabbath-breakers were officially to be cut off from the assembly or potentially killed. Observance in the Hebrew Bible was universally from sixth-day sundown to seventh-day sundown (cf. ), on a seven-day week. Consultations with prophets (II Kings iv. 23) were sought on the Sabbath. Sabbath corporate worship was not prescribed for the community at large, and the Sabbath activities at the shrines were originally a convocation of priests for the purpose of offering divine sacrifices, with family worship and rest being centered in homes.

Judaism

Jewish Shabbat (Shabbath, Shabbes, Shobos, etc.) is a weekly day of rest, observed from sundown on Friday until the appearance of three stars in the sky on Saturday night. Thirty-nine activities prohibited on Shabbat are listed in Tractate Shabbat (Talmud). Customarily, Shabbat is ushered in by lighting candles shortly before sunset, at halakhically calculated times that change weekly and geographically. The Dead Sea Scrolls Uncovered, a translation by Robert Eisenman and Michael Wise, reveals the Essene calendar as celebrating the Sabbath commencing on the 4th day of Abib (Nisan) page 192 3 days after the new moon of the Passover month then celebrated on the 11th, 18th and 25th. The second Essene month reveals a Sabbath on the second day exactly 7 days from the 25th of Abib Sabbath witnessing a solar calendar continuation for the rest of the year. The Essenes did it this way to be in harmony with the book of Genesis where God created the moon and sun on the 4th day and rested 3 days later.

Judah ha-Levi (12th century) proposed a nascent Jewish date line for dating of Shabbat, later calculated to fall between China and Japan (other lines exist, and travelers are expected to note both personal and local Shabbat); and Pinchas Elijah Horovitz (18th century) stated that polar regions should observe Shabbat based on calculating 24-hour days, although without establishing a date line.

Shabbat is a widely noted hallmark of Jewish peoples. Subbotniks (literally, Sabbatarians) are a Russian sect, categorized as either Jews or Judaizing Christians, that became particularly branded by strict Shabbat observance; (Hungarian-born radical Reform leader Ignaz Einhorn even shifted his congregation's Shabbat worship to Sundays.) Several weekly Shabbats per year are designated as Special Sabbaths, such as Shabbat haGadol, prior to Pesach (literally, "the High Sabbath", but not to be confused with other High Sabbaths); and Shabbat Teshuvah, prior to Yom Kippur ("Repentance Sabbath").

Shabbaton

Colloquially, in contemporary Israel, the term Shabbaton or Shaboson may mean an event or program of education and usually celebration held on Shabbat, or over an entire weekend with main focus on Shabbat. Such events are held by youth groups, singles groups, synagogues, schools, social groups, charitable groups or family reunions, can be either multi-generational and wide-open or limited-group, and can be held where a group usually meets or offsite. "Shabbaton", rather than just "retreat", signifies recognition of the importance of Shabbat in the event or program.. Another meaning of the term is what in English is called "Sabbatical", a period of paid leave from work, common mostly in educational systems.

Christianity

In Eastern Christianity, the Sabbath is considered still to be on Saturday, the seventh day, in remembrance of the Hebrew Sabbath. In Catholicism and most branches of Protestantism, the "Lord's Day" (Greek Κυριακή) is considered to be on Sunday, the first day (and "eighth day"). Communal worship, including the Holy Mysteries, may take place on any day, but a weekly observance of the resurrection is made consistently on Sunday. Western Christianity sometimes refers to the Lord's Day as a "Christian Sabbath", distinct from the Hebrew Sabbath, but related in varying manner.

First-day

Since Puritan times, most English-speaking Protestants identify the "Lord's Day" (viz., Sunday) with a "Christian Sabbath", a term Roman Catholics in those areas may also celebrate with the Eucharist. It is considered both the first day and the "eighth day" of the seven-day week. In Tonga, all commerce and entertainment activities cease on Sunday, starting at midnight and ending the next day, at midnight, as Tonga's constitution declares the Sabbath sacred forever. In Oriental Orthodoxy, the Ethiopian Orthodox Tewahedo Church has observed both Sunday Resurrection Day and Saturday Sabbath in different ways for several centuries, as have other Eastern Orthodox traditions.

Puritan Sabbatarianism or Reformed Sabbatarianism is strict observance of Sabbath in Christianity that is typically characterized by its avoidance of recreational activities. "Puritan Sabbath", expressed in the Westminster Confession of Faith, is often contrasted with "Continental Sabbath": the latter follows the Continental Reformed confessions such as the Heidelberg Catechism, which emphasize rest and worship on Lord's Day, but do not forbid recreational activities.

Seventh-day

Several Christian denominations observe Sabbath in a similar manner to Judaism, though with observance ending at Saturday sunset instead of Saturday nightfall. Early church historians Sozomen and Socrates cite the seventh day as the Christian day of worship except for the Christians in Rome and Alexandria. Many Sabbatarian Judeo-Christian groups were attested during the Middle Ages. The Waldensians, a religious group founded during the 12th century, are regarded as one of the first Post-Constantinian Christian groups to observe the seventh-day Sabbath. The Szekler Sabbatarians were founded in 1588 from among the Unitarian Church of Transylvania and maintained a presence until the group converted to Judaism in the 1870s. Seventh Day Baptists have observed Sabbath on Saturday since the mid-17th century (either from sundown or from midnight), and influenced the (now more numerous) Seventh-day Adventists in America to begin the practice in the mid-19th century. They believe that keeping seventh-day Sabbath is a moral responsibility equal to that of any of the other Ten Commandments, based on the example of Jesus. They also use "Lord's Day" to mean the seventh day, based on Scriptures in which God calls the day "my Sabbath" and "to the " and in which Jesus calls himself "Lord of Sabbath". The question of defining Sabbath worldwide on a round earth was resolved by some seventh-day Sabbatarians by making use of the International Date Line (i.e., permitting local rest-day adjustment), while others (such as some Alaskan Sabbatarians) keep Sabbath according to Jerusalem time (i.e., rejecting manmade temporal customs). Adherents of Messianic Judaism (a Christian sect or grouping of sects), also generally observe the Sabbath on Saturdays.

Many of the Lemba in southern Africa, like some other African tribes, are Jewish and claim common descent from the Biblical Israelites, based on observing traditional Jewish customs. Genetic analysis has also demonstrated that a distinct group of the Lemba, have the oral history and genetic ancestry of early Hebrews. The Lemba keep one day a week holy like Sabbath, and maintain many beliefs and practices associated with Judaism.

Seventh-day versus First-day

In 321 AD, Roman emperor Constantine the Great enacted the first civil law regarding Sunday observance. The law did not mention the Sabbath by name, but referred to a day of rest on "the venerable day of the sun."

An Abridgment of the Christian Doctrine: 
Q. How prove you that the church hath power to command feasts and holy days?
A. By the very act of changing the Sabbath into Sunday, which Protestants allow of; and therefore they fondly contradict themselves, by keeping Sunday strictly, and breaking most other feasts commanded by the same church.
Q. How prove you that?
A. Because by keeping Sunday, they acknowledge the church’s power to ordain feasts, and to command them under sin; and by not keeping the rest [of the feasts] by her commanded, they again deny, in fact, the same power.

The Augsburg Confession:
They [the Catholics] allege the Sabbath changed into Sunday, the Lord’s day, contrary to the decalogue, as it appears; neither is there any example more boasted of than the changing of the Sabbath day. Great, they say, is the power and authority of the church, since it dispensed with one of the ten commandments.

A Doctrinal Catechism,
Q. Have you any other way of proving that the Church has power to institute festivals of precept?
A. Had she not such power, she could not have done that in which all modern religionists agree with her. She could not have substituted the observance of Sunday the first day of the week, for the observance of Saturday the seventh day, a change for which there is no Scriptural authority.

Catholic Christian:
Q. Has the [Catholic] church power to make any alterations in the commandments of God?
A. ...Instead of the seventh day, and other festivals appointed by the old law, the church has prescribed the Sundays and holy days to be set apart for God’s worship; and these we are now obliged to keep in consequence of God’s commandment, instead of the ancient Sabbath.

The Catechism of the Council of Trent:
The Church of God has thought it well to transfer the celebration and observance of the Sabbath to Sunday!

New moon

The new moon, occurring every 29 or 30 days, is an important separately sanctioned occasion in Judaism and some other faiths. It is not widely regarded as Sabbath, but some messianic and Pentecostal churches, keep the day of the new moon as Sabbath or rest day, from evening to evening. New-moon services can last all day.

Some modern sects who are Sabbath keepers have suggested a Sabbath based on the New Moon citing Psalm 104:19 and Genesis 1:14 as a key prooftexts. Observers recognize the 1st, 8th, 15th, 22nd, and 29th days of the month of the Hebrew Calendar as Sabbath days which should be observed. They reject the 7 day week as non-biblical. The Lunar Sabbath theory is rejected by most Sabbatarian groups and Judaism as false and misleading but the recently discovered Dead Sea Scrolls translated by Eisenman and Wise show the Essene Jewish calendar revealing the first sabbath of the month of Nisan being on the 4th day 3 days after the new moon and kept every 7 days for the rest of the year. While some of the writings at the Dead Sea sect or Qumran state the 4th day, other writings such as HaYubilim XLIV:1 or The Jubilees 44:1  mention the seventh day of the 3rd moon a sacrifice takes place and Yaakob stays seven days later because travel in not permitted on Shabbat. Philo of Alexandria also mentions in Decalogue XXX (161) But to the seventh day of the week he has assigned the greatest festivals, those of the longest duration, at the periods of the equinox both vernal and autumnal in each year; appointing two festivals for these two epochs, each lasting seven days; the one which takes place in the spring being for the perfection of what is being sown, and the one which falls in autumn being a feast of thanksgiving for the bringing home of all the fruits which the trees have produced. And seven days have very appropriately been appointed to the seventh month of each equinox, so that each month might receive an especial honour of one sacred day of festival, for the purpose of refreshing and cheering the mind with its holiday.

Day of the Vow

Day of the Vow or Dingane's Day (Afrikaans Geloftedag or Dingaansdag, December 16) was the name of a religious public holiday in South Africa commemorating a famous Boer victory over the Zulu. Celebrated as annual Sabbath (a holy day of thanksgiving) since 1838, it was renamed Day of Reconciliation in 1994. The anniversary and its commemoration are intimately connected with various streams of Afrikaner and South African nationalism.

Millennial Sabbath

Since Hippolytus of Rome in the early third century, Christians have often considered that some thousand-year Sabbath, expected to begin six thousand years after Creation, might be identical with the millennium described in the Book of Revelation. This view was also popular among 19th- and 20th-century dispensational premillennialists.

Spiritual Sabbath

As another minority view, some modern Christians uphold Sabbath principles but do not limit observance to either Saturday or Sunday, instead advocating rest on any one chosen day of the week as following the spirit of Sabbath, or advocating Sabbath as instead a symbolic metaphor for rest in Christ. These look upon Sabbath as a principle to be observed in spirit rather than in letter, regarding the rest offered in Jesus as the only New Testament admonishment containing the root word of "Sabbath" and sometimes as a more permanent rest than a day could fulfill.

Latter Day Saint Movement
In 1831, Joseph Smith published a revelation commanding his related movement, the Latter Day Saint movement, to go to the house of prayer, offer up their sacraments, rest from their labors, and pay their devotions on the Lord's day (D&C 59:9–12).

Latter-day Saints believe this means performing no labor that would keep them from giving their full attention to spiritual matters (Ex. 20:10). LDS prophets have described this as meaning they should not shop, hunt, fish, attend sports events, or participate in similar activities on that day. Elder Spencer W. Kimball wrote in his The Miracle of Forgiveness that mere idle lounging on the Sabbath does not keep the day holy, and that it calls for constructive thoughts and acts.

Members of the Church are encouraged to prepare their meals with "singleness of heart" on the Sabbath (D&C 59:13) and believe the day is only for righteous activities (Is. 58:13.) In most areas of the world, this means worship on Sunday, though there is adaptation for Israel and many majority-Muslim countries.

In harmony with this revelation, members of the LDS church attend sacrament meeting each week. Other Sabbath-day activities may include: praying, meditating, studying the scriptures and the teachings of latter-day prophets, writing letters to family members and friends, reading wholesome material, visiting the sick and distressed, and attending other Church meetings.

Islam

The Quran shares the six-part Abrahamic creation narrative (32:4, 50:38) and the Sabbath as the seventh day (: 2:65, 4:47, 154, 7:163, 16:124), but God's mounting the throne after creation is taken in contradistinction to Elohim's concluding and resting from his labors. Also known as "Friday prayer",  is a congregational prayer held every Friday (the Day of Assembly), just after midday, in place of the otherwise daily  prayer; it commemorates the creation of Adam on the sixth day, as a loving gathering of Adam's sons.

The Quran states: "When the call is proclaimed to prayer on Friday, hasten earnestly to the Remembrance of Allah, and leave off business: That is best for you if ye but knew" (62:9). The next verse ("When the prayer is ended, then disperse in the land ...") leads many Muslims not to consider Friday a rest day, as in Indonesia, which regards the seventh-day Sabbath as unchanged; but many Muslim countries, such as Saudi Arabia, the United Arab Emirates and Bangladesh, do consider Friday a nonwork day, a holiday or a weekend; and other Muslim countries, like Pakistan, count it as half a rest day (after the Friday prayer is over).  attendance is strictly incumbent upon all free adult males who are

Other religious traditions

Seven-day week

By synecdoche (naming the whole for a part), in Jewish sources by the time of the Septuagint, the term "Sabbath" (Greek Sabbaton, Strong's 4521) also came to mean an entire "se'nnight" or seven-day week, the interval between two weekly Sabbaths. Jesus's parable of the Pharisee and the Publican describes the Pharisee as fasting "twice a week" (Greek dis tou sabbatou, literally, "Twice of the Sabbath"). Philo of Alexandria states in Decalogue XX. (96) The fourth commandment has reference to the sacred seventh day, that it may be passed in a sacred and holy manner. Now some states keep the holy festival only once in the month, counting from the new moon, as a day sacred to God; but the nation of the Jews keep every seventh day regularly, after each interval of six days; (97) and there is an account of events recorded in the history of the creation of the world, comprising a sufficient relation of the cause of this ordinance; for the sacred historian says, that the world was created in six days, and that on the seventh day God desisted from his works, and began to contemplate what he had so beautifully created; (98) therefore, he commanded the beings also who were destined to live in this state, to imitate God in this particular also, as well as in all others, applying themselves to their works for six days, but desisting from them and philosophising on the seventh day, and devoting their leisure to the contemplation of the things of nature, and considering whether in the preceding six days they have done anything which has not been holy, bringing their conduct before the judgment-seat of the soul, and subjecting it to a scrutiny, and making themselves give an account of all the things which they have said or done; the laws sitting by as assessors and joint inquirers, in order to the correcting of such errors as have been committed through carelessness, and to the guarding against any similar offences being hereafter repeated.

High Sabbaths

"High Sabbaths" are observed by Jews and some Christians. Seven annual Biblical festivals, called miqra ("called assembly") in Hebrew and "High Sabbath" in English and serving as supplemental testimonies to Sabbath, are specified in the books of Exodus and Deuteronomy; they do not necessarily fall on weekly Sabbath. Three occur in spring: the first and seventh days of Pesach (Passover), and Shavuot (Pentecost). Four occur in fall, in the seventh month, and are also called Shabbaton: Rosh Hashanah (Trumpets); Yom Kippur, "Sabbath of Sabbaths" (Atonement); and the first and eighth days of Sukkoth (Tabernacles). "High Sabbaths" is also often a synonym of "High Holy Days", viz., Rosh Hashanah and Yom Kippur.

Shmita 
Shmita (Strong's 8059 as shemittah, literally "release"), also called sabbatical year, is the seventh (שביעי, Strong's 7637 as shebiy'iy) year of the seven-year agricultural cycle mandated by Torah for the Land of Israel, relatively little observed in Biblical tradition, but still observed in contemporary Judaism. During Shmita, the land is left to lie fallow and all agricultural activity, including plowing, planting, pruning and harvesting, is forbidden by Torah and Jewish law. By tradition, other cultivation techniques (such as watering, fertilizing, weeding, spraying, trimming and mowing) may be performed as preventive measures only, not to improve the growth of trees or plants; additionally, whatever fruits grow of their own accord during that year are deemed hefker (ownerless), not for the landowner but for the poor, the stranger, and the beasts of the field; these fruits may be picked by anyone. A variety of laws also apply to the sale, consumption and disposal of Shmita produce. When the year ended, all debts, except those of foreigners, were to be remitted; in similar fashion, Torah requires a slave who had worked for six years to go free in the seventh year. Leviticus 25 promises bountiful harvests to those who observe Shmita, and describes its observance as a test of religious faith. The term Shmita is translated "release" five times in the Book of Deuteronomy (from the root שמט, shamat, "desist, remit", 8058).

Babylonian rest days

Counting from the new moon, the Babylonians celebrated the 7th, 14th, 21st, and 28th as "holy-days", also called "evil days" (meaning "unsuitable" for prohibited activities). On these days officials were prohibited from various activities and common men were forbidden to "make a wish", and at least the 28th was known as a "rest-day". On each of them, offerings were made to a different god and goddess. Tablets from the 6th-century BCE reigns of Cyrus the Great and Cambyses indicate these dates were sometimes approximate. The lunation of 29 or 30 days basically contained three seven-day weeks, and a final week of nine or ten days inclusive, breaking the continuous seven-day cycle. The Babylonians additionally celebrated the 19th as a special "evil day", the "day of anger", because it was roughly the 49th day of the (preceding) month, completing a "week of weeks", also with sacrifices and prohibitions. Difficulties with Friedrich Delitzsch's origin theory connecting Hebrew Shabbat with the Babylonian lunar cycle include reconciling the differences between an unbroken week and a lunar week, and explaining the absence of texts naming the lunar week as Shabbat in any language. Reconstruction of a broken tablet seems to define the rarely attested Babylonian Akkadian word Sapattum or Sabattum as the full moon: this word is cognate or merged with Hebrew Shabbat, but is monthly rather than weekly. It is regarded as a form of Sumerian sa-bat ("mid-rest"), attested in Akkadian as um nuh libbi ("day of mid-repose"). This conclusion is a contextual restoration of the damaged Enûma Eliš creation mythos, which is read as: "[Sa]pattu shalt thou then encounter, mid[month]ly."

The pentecontad calendar, thought to be of Amorite origin, includes a period known to Babylonians as Shappatum. The year is broken down into seven periods of fifty days (made up of seven weeks of seven days, containing seven weekly Sabbaths, and an extra fiftieth day, known as the atzeret), plus an annual supplement of fifteen or sixteen days, called Shappatum, the period of harvest time at the end of each year. Identified and reconstructed by Hildegaard and Julius Lewy in the 1940s, the calendar's use dates back to at least the 3rd millennium BCE in Western Mesopotamia and surrounding areas; it was used by the Canaanite tribes, thought by some to have been used by the Israelites prior to King Solomon, and related to the liturgical calendar of the Essenes at Qumran. Used well into the modern age, forms of it have been found in Nestorianism and among the Palestinian fellaheen. Julius Morgenstern believed that the calendar of the Jubilees had ancient origins as a somewhat modified survival of the pentecontad calendar.

Buddhist rest day

The Uposatha has been observed since Gautama Buddha's time (500 BCE), and is still being kept today in Theravada Buddhist countries. It occurs every seven or eight days, in accordance with the four phases of the moon. Buddha taught that Uposatha is for "the cleansing of the defiled mind", resulting in inner calm and joy. On this day, disciples and monks intensify their practice, deepen their knowledge, and express communal commitment through millennia-old acts of lay-monastic reciprocity.

Thai Chinese likewise observe their Sabbaths and traditional Chinese holidays according to lunar phases, but not on exactly the same days as Uposatha. These Sabbaths cycle through the month with respect to the Thai solar calendar, so common Thai calendars incorporate Thai and Chinese calendar lunar dates, as well as Uposatha dates, for religious purposes.

Cherokee rest days

The first day of the new moon, beginning at sunrise, is a holiday of quiet reflection and prayer among the Cherokee. Monthly fasting is encouraged, for up to four days. Work, cooking, sex and childbirth were also prohibited during the empty moon days, called "un-time" or "non-days"; childbirth during these days was considered unlucky. The Cherokee new year, the "great new moon" or "Hunting Moon", is the first new moon in autumn, after the setting of the Pleiades star cluster and around the time of the Leonids meteoric shower.

Sabbath as Saturday

One folk tradition in English is the widespread use of "Sabbath" as a synonym of midnight-to-midnight "Saturday" (literally, Saturn's day in at least a dozen languages): this is a simplification of the use of "Sabbath" in other religious contexts, where the two do not coincide. (Using midnight instead of sundown as delimiter dates back to the Roman Empire.) In over thirty other languages, the common name for this day in the seven-day week is a cognate of "Sabbath". "Sabbatini", originally "Sabbadini", often "Sabatini", etc., is a very frequent Italian name form ("Sabbatos" is the Greek form), indicating a family whose ancestor was born on Saturday, Italian sabato; "Domenico" indicated birth on Sunday.

In vampire hunter lore, people born on Saturday were specially designated as sabbatianoí in Greek and sâbotnichavi in Bulgarian (rendered in English as "Sabbatarians"). It was also believed in the Balkans that someone born on a Saturday could see a vampire when it was otherwise invisible.

Wicca

The annual cycle of the Earth's seasons is called the Wheel of the Year in Wicca and neopaganism. Eight sabbats (occasionally "sabbaths", or "Sun sabbats") are spaced at approximately even intervals throughout the year. Samhain, which coincides with Halloween, is considered the first sabbat of the year.

An esbat is a ritual observance of the full moon in Wicca and neopaganism. Some groups extend the esbat to include the dark moon and the first and last quarters. "Esbat" and "sabbat" are distinct and are probably not cognate terms, although an esbat is also called "moon sabbat".

European records from the Middle Ages to the 17th century or later also place Witches' Sabbaths on similar dates to sabbats in modern Wicca, but with some disagreement; medieval reports of sabbat activity are generally not firsthand and may be imaginative, but many persons were accused of, or tried for, taking part in sabbats.

Unification Church

The Unification Church has a regular day of worship on Sunday, but every eight days Unificationists celebrate the day of Ahn Shi Il, considered as Sabbath but cycling among the weekdays of the Gregorian calendar. The Family Pledge, formerly recited at 5:00 a.m. on Sundays, was moved to Ahn Shi Il in 1994 and includes eight verses containing the phrase "by centering on true love".

Baháʼí Faith

The day of rest in the Baháʼí Faith is Friday.

Secular traditions

Secular use of "Sabbath" for "rest day", while it usually refers to the same period of time (Sunday) as the majority Christian use of "Sabbath", is often stated in North America to refer to different purposes for the rest day than those of Christendom. In McGowan v. Maryland (1961), the Supreme Court of the United States held that contemporary Maryland blue laws (typically, Sunday rest laws) were intended to promote the secular values of "health, safety, recreation, and general well-being" through a common day of rest, and that this day coinciding with majority Christian Sabbath neither reduces its effectiveness for secular purposes nor prevents adherents of other religions from observing their own holy days. Massachusetts, uncharacteristically, does not specify the weekday in its "Day of Rest" statute, providing only that one day off from work is required every week; an unspecified weekly day off is a very widespread business production cycle. The Supreme Court of Canada, in R. v. Big M Drug Mart Ltd. (1985) and R. v. Edwards Books and Art Ltd. (1986), found some blue laws invalid for having no legitimate secular purpose, but others valid because they had no religious purpose.

The weekend is that period of the week set aside by custom or law for rest from labor. In many countries it is Saturday and Sunday and often includes Friday night. This five-day workweek arose in America when labor unions attempted to accommodate Jewish Sabbath, beginning at a New England cotton mill and also instituted by Henry Ford in 1926; it became standard in America by about 1940 and spread among English-speaking and European countries to become the international workweek. China adopted it in 1995 and Hong Kong by 2006. India and some other countries follow both the international workweek and a more traditional Saturday half-workday and Sunday weekend. While Indonesia and Lebanon have the international workweek, most Muslim countries count Friday as the weekend, alone or with Thursday (all or half) or Saturday. Some universities permit a three-day weekend from Friday to Sunday. The weekend in Israel, Nepal, and parts of Malaysia, is Friday (all or half) and Saturday. Only the one-day customary or legal weekends are usually called "Sabbath".

State-mandated rest days 

State-mandated rest days are widespread. Laws of the Han dynasty (206 BCE – 220 CE) required imperial officials to rest on every mu (every fifth day), within a ten-day Chinese week. The rest day was changed to huan or xún (every tenth day) in the Tang dynasty (618–907).

The reform calendar of the French Revolution was used from 1793 to 1805. It contained twelve months of three ten-day weeks; the five or six extra days needed to approximate the tropical year were placed after the months at the end of each year. The tenth day of each week, décadi, replaced Sunday as the day of rest and festivity in France.

From 1929 to 1931, the Soviet Union mandated a five-day week, with each day designated by color as a state rest day for a different 20% of the workforce; families usually did not share rest days. Three weeks a year were six or seven days, because interrupted by holidays. From 1931 to 1940, the Soviets mandated a six-day week, with state rest days for all upon the 6th, 12th, 18th, 24th, and 30th of each Gregorian month, as well as upon March 1. This also necessitated varying weeks of five to seven days over the year.

Among many calendar reform proposals that eliminate the constant seven-day week in exchange for simplified calculation of calendrical data like weekday names for given dates, some retain Sabbatical influences. The Hermetic Lunar Week Calendar uses moon phases, resulting in weeks of six to nine days. The International Fixed Calendar and World Calendar both consist of 364-day years containing exactly 52 weeks (each starting on a day designated as Sunday), with an additional one or two intercalary "blank" days not designated as part of any week (Year Day and Leap Day in the International Fixed Calendar; Worldsday and Leapyear Day in the World Calendar). Reform supporters sought to accommodate Sabbatical observance by retaining the modified week and designating the intercalary days as additional Sabbaths or holidays; however, religious leaders held that such days disrupt the traditional seven-day weekly cycle. This unresolved issue contributed to the cessation of reform activities in the 1930s (International Fixed Calendar) and again in 1955 (World Calendar), though supporters of both proposals remain.

Subbotnik
The subbotnik is a weekly day of volunteer work on Saturday in Russia, other (former) Soviet republics, the Eastern Bloc, and the German Democratic Republic, sporadically observed since 1919. The voskresnik is a related volunteer workday on Sunday. They focus on community service work; "Lenin's Subbotnik" was also observed annually around his birthday.

Sabbatical

From the biblical sabbatical year came the modern concept of a sabbatical, a prolonged, often one-year, hiatus in the career of an individual (not usually tied to a seven-year period). Such a period is often taken in order to fulfill some goal such as writing a book or traveling extensively for research. Some universities and other institutional employers of scientists, physicians, or academics offer paid sabbatical as an employee benefit, called "sabbatical leave"; some companies offer unpaid sabbatical for people wanting to take career breaks.

References

External links
 
 
 
 

 
Religious holidays
Working time